St. Mark's Church is an Anglican parish church in Grenoside, South Yorkshire, England.

Regular Sunday services are at 10:00am. Hospitality, fellowship and food are a speciality; when a month has a fifth Sunday breakfast is sometimes served to all-comers. Other groups for adults and children meet at different times through the week.

References

Further reading
 A Short Survey of Historical Grenoside, C. Morley 1984 - local publication.

External links
St Mark's website

19th-century Church of England church buildings
Grenoside, St Mark's church
Churches in Sheffield